Bishops of Samogitia, Samogitian diocese (now a part of Lithuania) from 1417 to 1926.

The seat of the diocese was in Varniai/Medininkai until 1864, when it was moved to Kaunas. It was liquidated in 1926 by Pope Pius XI when the archdiocese of Kaunas was created.

References
 Błaszczyk, Grzegorz. Diecezja żmudzka od XV do początku XVII wieku : ustrój—Wyd. 1. – Poznań : Wydaw. Naukowe UAM, 1993. – 369 p, Uniwersytet im. Adama Mickiewicza w Poznaniu. Seria Historia ; Nr. 180) ; ISSN 0554-8217

External links
 Lietuvos dailės muziejaus Žemaičių vyskupai
 Varniai muziejaus Žemaičių vyskupai
 Varnių katedra

 Samogitia

Bishops
History of Samogitia